The men's 50 metre freestyle S9 event at the 2020 Paralympic Games took place on 29 August 2021, at the Tokyo Aquatics Centre.

Final

References

Swimming at the 2020 Summer Paralympics